Silicon Sisters is a video game developer based in Vancouver, British Columbia. The studio creates games aimed at a female audience and is the first Canadian video game studio owned and run solely by women.

History
The video game market has been expanding exponentially. Much of this market growth is driven by women aged 30-50 flocking to the casual games portals. Content creators are caught playing catch up - how do Gaming Companies create new and engaging games for this hungry new market? What is the next big genre? Romance. Silicon Sisters is creating a new genre for this market - and will be the Harlequin Romance of the video game world as said by Reviewers. Silicon Sisters was founded by Brenda Bailey Gershkovitch and Kirsten Forbes in July 2010. The studio released their first game, School 26, in April 2011. School 26 used the tool of empathy to advance in the game, and was downloaded more than 1,000,000 times in English, French and Japanese in 36 different countries. The game gained recognition from parenting groups and game reviewers for the diversity represented in the game, as well as the positive skills gained by exploring empathy. Its sequel, School 26: Summer of Secrets, followed in the summer of 2012 and saw the exchange of secrets to advance or hinder the forward movement in the game.

In 2013, the studio released Everlove: Rose, a choose your own adventure light romance RPG geared towards adult women. The game was well received critically, but was not a commercial success.

References

External links 
 

Companies based in Vancouver
Video game companies established in 2010
Video game companies of Canada
Video game development companies
Women video game developers
2010 establishments in British Columbia